Zen is the codename for a family of computer processor microarchitectures from AMD, first launched in February 2017 with the first generation of its Ryzen CPUs. It is used in Ryzen (desktop and mobile), Ryzen Threadripper (workstation/high end desktop), and Epyc (server).

Comparison

History

First generation

The first generation Zen was launched with the Ryzen 1000 series of CPUs (codenamed Summit Ridge) in February 2017. The first Zen-based preview system was demonstrated at E3 2016, and first substantially detailed at an event hosted a block away from the Intel Developer Forum 2016. The first Zen-based CPUs reached the market in early March 2017, and Zen-derived Epyc server processors (codenamed "Naples") launched in June 2017 and Zen-based APUs (codenamed "Raven Ridge") arrived in November 2017. This first iteration of Zen utilized Global Foundries' 14 nm manufacturing process.

First generation refresh

Zen+ was first released in April 2018, powering the second generation of Ryzen processors, known as Ryzen 2000 (codenamed "Pinnacle Ridge") for mainstream desktop systems, and Threadripper 2000 (codenamed "Colfax") for high-end desktop setups. Zen+ used Global Foundries' 12 nm process, an enhanced version of their 14 nm node.

Second generation

The Ryzen 3000 series CPUs were released on July 7, 2019, while the Zen 2-based Epyc server CPUs (codename "Rome") were released on August 7, 2019. Zen 2 Matisse products were the first consumer CPUs to use TSMC's 7 nm process node. Zen 2 introduced the chiplet based architecture, where desktop, workstation, and server CPUs are all produced as multi-chip modules (MCMs); these Zen 2 products utilise the same core chiplets but are attached to different uncore silicon (different IO dies) in a hub and spoke topology. This approach differs from Zen 1 products, where the same die (Zeppelin) is used in a simple monolithic package for Summit Ridge products (Ryzen 1000 series) or used as interconnected building blocks in an MCM (up to four Zeppelin dies) for first generation Epyc and Threadripper products. For earlier Zen 2 products the IO and uncore functions are performed within this separate IO die, which contains the memory controllers, the fabric to enable core to core communication, and the bulk of uncore functions. The IO die used by Matisse processors is a small chip produced on GF 12 nm, whereas the server IO die utilized for Threadripper and Epyc is far larger. The server IO die is able to serve as a hub to connect up to eight 8-core chiplets, while the IO die for Matisse is able to connect up to  two 8-core chiplets. These chiplets are linked by AMD's own second generation Infinity Fabric, allowing a low-latency interconnect between the cores and to IO. The processing cores in the chiplets are organized in CCXs (Core Complexes) of four cores, linked together to form a single eight core CCD (Core Chiplet Die).

Zen 2 also powers a line of mobile and desktop APUs marketed as Ryzen 4000, as well as fourth generation  Xbox consoles and the PlayStation 5. The Zen 2 core microarchitecture is also used in the upcoming Mendocino APU, a 6nm system on a chip aimed at mainstream mobile and other energy efficient low power computing products.

Third generation

Zen 3 was released on November 5, 2020, using a more matured 7 nm manufacturing process, powering Ryzen 5000 series CPUs and APUs (codename "Vermeer" (CPU) and "Cézanne" (APU)) and Epyc processors (codename "Milan"). Zen 3's main performance gain over Zen 2 is the introduction of a unified CCX, which means that each core chiplet is now composed of eight cores with access to 32MB of cache, instead of two sets of four cores with access to 16MB of cache each.

On April 1, 2022, AMD released the new Ryzen 6000 series for the laptop, using an improved Zen 3+ architecture, bringing RDNA 2 graphics integrated in a APU to the PC for the first time. 

Zen 3D was officially previewed on May 31, 2021, and released on April 20, 2022. Zen 3D differs from Zen 3 in that it includes V-cache, 3D-stacked L3 cache. This added cache brings an approximately 15% performance increase in gaming applications on average.

Zen 3D for server, codenamed Milan-X was announced in AMD Accelerated Data Center Premiere Keynote on November 8, 2021. It should bring a 50% increase in select datacenter applications over Zen 3's Milan CPUs while maintaining socket compatibility with them. Milan-X was released on March 21, 2022.

Fourth generation 

Epyc server CPUs with Zen 4, codenamed Genoa, were officially unveiled at AMD's Accelerated Data Center Premiere Keynote on November 8, 2021. They will have up to 96 Zen 4 cores and will support both PCIE 5.0 and DDR5.

Furthermore, Zen 4 Cloud (a variant of Zen 4), abbreviated to Zen 4c and codenamed Bergamo, was also announced. Zen 4c is designed to have significantly greater density than standard Zen4 while delivering greater power efficiency. This is achieved by redesigning Zen4's cache (presumably removing a certain amount of L2 and L3 cache) to maximise density and compute throughput. Bergamo will have up to 128 Zen 4c cores and will be socket-compatible with Genoa.

Both Zen 4 and Zen 4 Cloud will be manufactured on a non-specified variety of TSMC 5 nm and are slated to launch in 2022.

In addition to the Epyc 7004 server processors (Genoa and Bergamo), in May 2022 AMD's roadmap showed that Zen 4 will power Ryzen 7000 mainstream desktop processors (codenamed "Raphael"), high-end mobile processors (codenamed "Dragon Range"), thin and light mobile processors (codenamed "Phoenix").

Fifth generation 

Zen 5 was shown on AMD's Zen roadmap in May 2022. It is believed to use TSMC's 3nm process. It will power Ryzen 8000 mainstream desktop processors (codenamed "Granite Ridge"), high-end mobile processors (codenamed "Strix Point"), and Epyc 7005 server processors (codenamed "Turin").

See also
 Threadripper
 Epyc
Intel Core

References

AMD microarchitectures
Computer-related introductions in 2017
X86 microarchitectures